Parastrophia is a genus of minute sea snails, marine gastropod molluscs or micromollusks in the family Caecidae.

Species
Species within the genus Parastrophia include:
 Parastrophia asturiana de Folin, 1870
 Parastrophia avaricosa Vannozzi, Pizzini & Raines, 2015
 Parastrophia cecalupoi Vannozzi, 2017
 Parastrophia challengeri de Folin, 1880
 Parastrophia christinae Selli, 1974 
  Parastrophia cornucopiae (de Folin, 1869)
 Parastrophia cygnicollis (Hedley, 1904)
 Parastrophia elegans (de Folin, 1880)
 Parastrophia erseusi Hughes, 1993
 Parastrophia ingens Vannozzi, 2017
 Parastrophia ivani Vannozzi, 2017
 Parastrophia japonica Hinoide & Habe, 1978
 Parastrophia megadattilida Pizzini, Raines & Vannozzi, 2013
 Parastrophia melanesiana Pizzini, Raines & Vannozzi, 2013
 Parastrophia monicae Vannozzi, 2017
 Parastrophia ornata Vannozzi, Pizzini & Raines, 2015
 Parastrophia pulcherrima Pizzini, Raines & Vannozzi, 2013
 Parastrophia queenslandica (Iredale & Laseron, 1957)
 † Parastrophia radwanskii Bałuk, 1975 
 Parastrophia reticulata Vannozzi, 2017
  Parastrophia sumatrana (Thiele, 1925)
  Parastrophia vanuatuensis Pizzini, Raines & Vannozzi, 2013 
Species brought into synonymy
 Parastrophia filum Melvill, 1906: synonym of Parastrophia cornucopiae (de Folin, 1869)
 Parastrophia folini Bucquoy, Dautzenberg & Dollfus, 1884: synonym of Parastrophia asturiana de Folin, 1870 
 † Parastrophia garganica Montcharmont-Zei, 1954: synonym of Parastrophia asturiana de Folin, 1870

References

 Gofas, S.; Le Renard, J.; Bouchet, P. (2001). Mollusca, in: Costello, M.J. et al. (Ed.) (2001). European register of marine species: a check-list of the marine species in Europe and a bibliography of guides to their identification. Collection Patrimoines Naturels, 50: pp. 180–213
 Pizzini M., Raines B. & Vannozzi A. (2013) The family Caecidae in the South-West Pacific (Gastropoda: Rissooidea). Bollettino Malacologico, 49 (suppl. 10): 1-78.

External links
 Folin, L. de. (1880). On the Mollusca of H.M.S. 'Challenger' Expedition.--The Caecidae, comprising the genera Parastrophia, Watsonia, and Caecum. Proceedings of the Zoological Society of London. 1879: 806-812
 Costa, O. G. (1861). Microdoride mediterranea; o, Descrizione de poco ben conosciuti od affatto ignoti viventi minuti e micoscropici del Meditterraneo, pel professore O. G. Costa. Tomo primo. Con tredici tavole. i-xviii, 1-80. Stamperia dell'Iride, Napoli
 Di Staso A. (1905). Contributo alla conoscenza della famiglia Caecidae. Zoologische Jahrbücher, Abteilung für Systematik, Geographie und Biologie der Tiere. 22: 433-448, pl. 12

Caecidae